Alojz Petrovič (born 12 May 1936) is a Croatian gymnast. He competed at the 1960 Summer Olympics and the 1964 Summer Olympics.

References

1936 births
Living people
Croatian male artistic gymnasts
Olympic gymnasts of Yugoslavia
Gymnasts at the 1960 Summer Olympics
Gymnasts at the 1964 Summer Olympics
People from Osijek-Baranja County
20th-century Croatian people